The Mummy Demastered is a Metroidvania video game released in October 2017 by WayForward Technologies based on the 2017 film The Mummy. It takes place concurrently with the events of the film, with players playing Prodigium soldiers under the command of Dr. Henry Jekyll (with the likeness of Russell Crowe from the film) who must fight the evil forces of Princess Ahmanet (with the likeness of Sofia Boutella). The game released for Windows, PlayStation 4, and Xbox One in October 2017. The Nintendo Switch version was released in Japan on July 30, 2020. A version for Amazon Luna was released on October 20, 2020.

Gameplay
The Mummy Demastered is a Metroidvania-style game where players traverse a large map which opens up to the player as they make progress in the game. Upon dying the game resets the player as a new character, who then must retrieve their items from a zombified version of their former selves.

The player's character is a soldier who works for Prodigium, as they follow Princess Ahmanet and battle her monsters, before eventually defeating her and Set in the final battle. There are two endings in this game, each of which are determined by the player's survival in their escape from the collapsing tomb. A third ending is seen if the player hasn't died in the save file, thus never having created a new character.

In terms of the Metroidvania genre, Destructoid noted that the game seems to more closely resemble later side scrolling Castlevania games as opposed to Super Metroid, with GameSpot noting that it also seemingly takes influence from Ghosts 'n Goblins.

Reception

The Mummy Demastered received "generally positive" reviews for Microsoft Windows, PlayStation 4, and Nintendo Switch and "mixed or average" reviews for Xbox One, with critics praising WayForward's pixel art and mastery of the Metroidvania genre, while also noting it as a massive improvement over the movie it was based on.

References

External links
 

2017 video games
Metroidvania games
Nintendo Switch games
PlayStation 4 games
PlayStation Network games
Retro-style video games
Shooter video games
Single-player video games
The Mummy video games
Video games developed in the United States
Windows games
Xbox One games
WayForward games